María Díaz Cirauqui (born 5 May 1995) is a Spanish footballer who plays as a midfielder for Dijon.

Career

In 2010, Díaz Cirauqui signed for Spanish second tier side Osasuna. In 2014, she signed for Real Sociedad in the Spanish top flight. In 2021, she signed for French club Fleury.

References

External links

 María Díaz Cirauqui at playmakerstats.com 

1995 births
Athletic Club Femenino players
CA Osasuna Femenino players
Dijon FCO (women) players
Division 1 Féminine players
Expatriate women's footballers in France
FC Fleury 91 (women) players
Living people
Primera Federación (women) players
Primera División (women) players
Spanish expatriate sportspeople in France
Spanish women's footballers
Sportspeople from Navarre
Women's association football midfielders